Chauvetia gigantea is a species of sea snail, a marine gastropod mollusc in the family Buccinidae, the true whelks.

Description

Distribution
This marine species occurs off Senegal.

References

 Oliver J.D. & Rolan E. 2008. Las especies del género Chauvetia (Gastropoda, Neogastropoda) del área de Dakar, Senegal, África occidental, con la descripción de diez especies nuevas. Iberus 26(2) : 133-175

External links

Buccinidae
Gastropods described in 2008